Circuit Breakers is a racing game developed by Supersonic Software and published by Mindscape for the PlayStation. It is the sequel to Supersonic Racers.

It was the first (and possibly only) PlayStation title ever to receive expansion packs through Demo discs released with Official UK PlayStation Magazine.

A remake for the PlayStation 2 was released in Europe only under the name Circuit Blasters in 2005.

Reception

The game received average reviews according to the review aggregation website GameRankings. Edge gave it a favourable review over a month before it was released in Europe. Next Generation said, "If you possess a multitap and three willing friends, this game should be at the very top of your 'must buy' list." However, GameSpot gave the European version a negative review, a few months before it was released Stateside.

References

External links
 

1998 video games
PlayStation (console) games
PlayStation (console)-only games
Racing video games
Video game sequels
Video games developed in the United Kingdom
Mindscape games
Supersonic Software games
Multiplayer and single-player video games